Rhadinastis serpula is a moth in the family Cosmopterigidae. It was described by Edward Meyrick in 1932. It is found in Taiwan.

References

Cosmopteriginae
Moths described in 1932